Route 14 is a  state highway in southeastern Massachusetts. It runs from Route 27 in Brockton east to Route 3A in Duxbury, near the coastline.

Route 3 (Pilgrims Highway) has an interchange with Route 14, at Exit 22 (formerly exit 11) in Duxbury.


Route description

From its western terminus at Route 27 in Brockton, Route 14 goes through Whitman south of the center of the town before going the northeastern corner of East Bridgewater, crossing Route 27 once more.  In Hanson, the road is concurrent with Route 58 through the center of town, past Wampatuck Pond.  It passes into Pembroke between Oldham Pond and Furnace Pond before passing through the center of town.  After another concurrency with Route 53, the road passes into Duxbury, crossing Route 3 before ending at Route 3A west of Duxbury Village.

History
In 1933, Route 14 was extremely short, with its western terminus at Route 3 (current Route 53). By 1936 it had been extended out to its current routing in Brockton.

Major intersections

References

Neilbert.com Massachusetts Route Log

014
Brockton, Massachusetts
Whitman, Massachusetts
East Bridgewater, Massachusetts
Hanson, Massachusetts
Pembroke, Massachusetts
Duxbury, Massachusetts
Transportation in Plymouth County, Massachusetts